Wang Xi (born August 1966) is a Chinese materials scientist and politician who is an academician of the Chinese Academy of Sciences, and currently vice governor of Guangdong.

He was an alternate member of the 19th Central Committee of the Chinese Communist Party and is alternate member of the 20th Central Committee of the Chinese Communist Party.

Early life and education
Wang was born in Shanghai, in August 1966, while his ancestral home in Nantong, Jiangsu. He attended the Nantong Middle School of Jiangsu Province. In 1987, he graduated from the Department of Engineering Physics, Tsinghua University. He went on to receive his master's degree in 1990 and doctor's degree in 1993 from the Shanghai Institute of Metallurgy, Chinese Academy of Sciences (CAS), all in material physics.

Academic career
After graduating in 1994, he stayed and worked at the Shanghai Institute of Metallurgy, Chinese Academy of Sciences, where he was promoted to deputy director of the Third Research Office in 1996 and director of the Third Research Office in 1998. He then continued working in the newly restructured Shanghai Institute of Microsystems and Information Technology, where he moved up the ranks to become deputy president in 2004 and president in 2010. In December 2009, he was unanimously chosen as an academician of the Chinese Academy of Sciences, becoming the youngest member the Chinese Academy of Sciences in 2009. He served a short term as vice chairman of the China Association for Science and Technology from June 2016 to May 2017. He also served as president of the CAS's Shanghai Institute of Advanced Research from April 2017 to May 2019. He was a visiting scholar at the Australian Commonwealth Institute of Science and Industry between July 1993 and May 1994 and the Rosendorf Research Center, Germany between May 1996 and June 1998.

Political career
Wang joined the Chinese Communist Party (CCP) in April 2001. He began his political career in May 2019, when he was appointed vice minister of the Science and Technology.

Wang was chosen as vice governor of Guangdong in August 2020 and in May 2022 he was admitted to member of the Standing Committee of the CCP Guangdong Provincial Committee, the province's top authority.

Honours and awards 
 2006 State Science and Technology Progress Award (First Class) for the research and industrialization of high-end silicon based SOI materials
 2008 Science and Technology Progress Award of the Ho Leung Ho Lee Foundation
 December 2009 Member of the Chinese Academy of Sciences (CAS)

References

1966 births
Living people
Scientists from Shanghai
Chinese physicians
Tsinghua University alumni
Members of the Chinese Academy of Sciences
Alternate members of the 19th Central Committee of the Chinese Communist Party
Alternate members of the 20th Central Committee of the Chinese Communist Party